Nottingham & Union Rowing Club is a rowing club on the River Trent, based at Trentside, West Bridgford, Nottingham, Nottinghamshire.

History
The club was founded in 1946 as an amalgamation of two clubs called the Nottingham Union Rowing Club and the original Nottingham Rowing Club (not the modern club formed in 2006). The reason for the merger of the two clubs was because the boathouse belonging to the Nottingham Union club was destroyed by bombs in World War II leaving them no base to row from.

The club won the prestigious Wyfold Challenge Cup at the Henley Regatta in 1963 and 2010.

Notable members
Arnold Cooke
Richard Nicholson (1966 World Rowing Championships) 
R C Waite (1966 World Rowing Championships) 
Peter Webb

Honours

Henley Royal Regatta

British champions

References

Sport in Nottinghamshire
Sport in Nottingham
Rowing clubs in England
Rowing clubs of the River Trent
Nottingham